Treading Water (also titled The Boy Who Smells Like Fish) is a 2013 Mexican-Canadian comedy-drama film directed by Analeine Cal y Mayor and starring Douglas Smith and Zoë Kravitz.  It is Cal y Mayor's feature directorial debut.

Cast
Douglas Smith as Mica
Zoe Kravitz as Laura
Carrie-Anne Moss as Catherine
Ariadna Gil as Sophie
Gonzalo Vega as Guillermo Garibai
Don McKellar as Richard

Release
The film premiered at the Miami International Film Festival in March 2013.

Reception
The film has a 40 percent rating on Rotten Tomatoes based on 10 reviews.

Nick Schager of Variety gave the film a negative review and wrote, "Emitting the unpleasant stench of over-affectation, Treading Water slaps together its particular peculiarities with such randomness, it’s as if the film were conceived from blindly throwing disparate elements at the wall."

Sheila O'Malley of RogerEbert.com awarded the film two and a half stars.

Mark Adams of Screen Daily gave the film a positive review, calling it "a gentle charmer punctuated with a series of nicely judged performance and an increasing sense of magical realism."

References

External links
 
 
 The Boy Who Smells Like Fish at Library and Archives Canada

2013 films
2013 comedy-drama films
English-language Canadian films
2010s English-language films
English-language Mexican films
Mexican comedy-drama films
Canadian comedy-drama films
2010s Canadian films
2010s Mexican films